International Exhibition of Calligraphy — a project organized by Contemporary museum of calligraphy, with the support of the Museum-educational complex Sokolniki. Its aim is the promotion of the art of calligraphy and its educational significance through exhibitions and festivals.

About 

Calligraphy is the art of giving form to signs in an expressive, harmonious and skillful manner (Mediavilla 1996: 18).

In 2008 Alexey Shaburov, the President of Sokolniki Exhibition and Convention Centre initiated the project with renowned calligraphers and designers, namely Pyotr Chobitko, Evgeny Dobrovinsky, professors Leonid Pronenko, Pavel Semchenko, one of the founders of the Soviet calligraphy school Ilya Bogdesko, and Nikolay Taranov to join it within a few months.

Participants 

Over the years of the project's existence, it has featured works by renowned calligraphers from the following countries:

Australia, Argentina, Armenia, Belarus, Belgium, Bulgaria, Brazil, Great Britain, Hungary, Germany, Hong Kong, Greece, Georgia, Israel, India, Jordan, Morocco, the Netherlands, Norway, Pakistan, Palestine, Peru, Poland, Russia, Serbia, Syria, Slovenia, USA, Taiwan, Tunisia, Turkey, Uzbekistan, Ukraine, Finland, France, Montenegro, Czech Republic, Ethiopia, United Arab Emirates, South Africa.

Events

Exhibitions 

 I International Exhibition of Calligraphy

Repin State Academic Institute of Painting Sculpture and Architecture hosted the I International Exhibition of Calligraphy on September 16–21, 2008. On the first day, more than 500 people visited it even before the official opening.480 works from 26 states were presented. In total, over 700 works were submitted for the exhibition.

More than 20 lectures and workshops from Russian and foreign artists were held during the five days of the Exhibition. The exhibition boasted with the presence of 40 renowned international calligraphers.

Interesting facts

The welcome book was to be posted an entry in with ink and quill.

All female visitors on the last day of the Exhibition were presented with white roses.

Visitors of the event included a just-married couple and a group of cadets.

 Mystery of the world calligraphy (special exposition)

December 9–14, 2008 the Contemporary Museum of Calligraphy held the special exhibit ‘Mysteries of the world calligraphy’ dedicated to the Constitution Day. A formal trigger to launch this exhibit was the arrival of a new item: the Handwritten Constitution of the Russian Federation, first of its kind in the Post-Soviet Russia. This A2-sized work has been performed in five months by Pyotr Chobitko, Chairman of the National Union of Calligraphers, in person (with the exception of lining the sheets).

The exhibition featured several workshops and lectures by Russian and international artists.

 II International Exhibition of Calligraphy

Dates: October 14 - November 14, 2009.

Venue: Sokolniki Exhibition and Convention Centre.

Total exhibition area: 5,000 sq.m.

This exhibition became a benchmark event in the project's history, and here's why:
 It was held under the aegis of the Commission of the Russian Federation for UNESCO with the support of the Ministry of Culture of the Russian Federation
 It received UFI's (Global Association of the Exhibition Industry) approval for high professional level of exhibitions organization 
 In 2010, the project entered the final three of exhibitions World Cup according to Exhibition News Awards (London).
The event featured 72 workshops offered by the leading calligraphy masters of the world, among them
 Barbara Calzolari who has worked for Pope Benedict XVI and G8 leaders;
 Evgeny Drobyazin, author of the calligraphic text of the National Anthem of Russia which Silvio Berlusconi presented to the then President Dmitry Medvedev during the G8 summit in L’Aquila;
 Nja Mahdaoui, winner of numerous art contests, member of the UNESCO international jury on art awards distribution;
 Pyotr Chobitko, Chairman of the National Union of Calligraphers;
 Massimo Polello, President of the Guild of Calligraphers of Turin;
 Other renowned calligraphers from Russia, Ukraine, Belarus, Israel, Italy, France, Tunisia, China, and Serbia.
Unique pieces premiered at the exhibition:
 Tsar Mezuzah — the only calligraphy piece to enter the Guinness Book of World Records;
 the Sacred Calligraphy collection;
 a calligraphy scroll 30 meters long;
 a 4.5 meters long carpet decorated with weaved Arabic writings; 
 birch bark manuscripts, pergamens, Chinese and Korean scrolls; 
 Decalogue — a calligraphy book unique in design and complexity. 
The framework of the exhibition also featured the "From the Earth to the Universe" project, representing a collection of unique photographs of the vast depths of space.

 III International Exhibition of Calligraphy

The III International Exhibition of Calligraphy was successfully held September 10–12, 2010 in Veliky Novgorod. A special-built mobile pavilion erected in the city historic centre near the Kremlin in Yaroslav's Court became its venue. The project's unique feature is that the event was the first ever large-scale travelling exhibition of a current ICOM member. The Exhibition received RUEF (Russian Union of exhibitions and fairs) approval for high professional level of exhibitions organization.

— Over 37000 visitors attended the event over the three days

— 19 trucks with equipment and exhibits travelled from Moscow to Novgorod to make it happen

— They carried 136 tons of cargo

— A team of 91 from the Contemporary Museum of Calligraphy and the MVK International Exhibition Company came from Moscow to prepare the exhibition.

Over the four days of the event, 46 workshops were held. In total, 35 renowned calligraphy artists took part in the exhibition. Novgorod residents had a chance to see over 300 calligraphy exhibits, including some listed in the Guinness Book of World Records.

For the first time a wakeboarding tournament for WakeWorld Russia Cup took place within the Exhibition, with best professional riders from Russia, Europe and Asia. The Museum Night project was also held in cooperation with the Novgorod State United Museum-Reserve.

 IV International Exhibition of Calligraphy

Date — November 1 – December 15, 2012. Venue — the Contemporary museum of calligraphy.

10 new authors from European and Eastern countries with their distinct styles and personalities took part in the 4th International Exhibition of Calligraphy. Valerian Bakharev's “I Ching Signs” consisting of 64 hexagrammic paintings became the symbol of the exposition.

The unique feature of this exhibition was the fact that the exposition changed 6 times. The program included lectures and workshops for both adults and children.

 V International Exhibition of Calligraphy

V International Exhibition of Calligraphy was held in Moscow March 14 through April 12, 2015. The anniversary event boasted with the participation of a recorв number of participants: 90 artists from 52 countries who presented 201 calligraphy artworks. The theme of the exposition was ‘Reflections on the Motherland’. 

One of the unique pieces presented at the exhibition was the handwritten Gospel of Mark created by the Russian artist Apollinariya Mishina. The book contains a series of illustrations on 155 pages, 104 of which are miniatures made in colour etching technique and illuminated with leaf gold. This piece was highly praised by the Russian Orthodox Church.

 VI International Exhibition of Calligraphy

The autumn cultural season in Moscow has been marked with opening of the 6th International Exhibition of Calligraphy, which triumphed in Sokolniki Park between September 1 and 10 in an exhibit hall custom built for this grand international project. The exhibit featured over 350 masterpieces by 150 calligraphy artists from more than 60 countries.

The exhibit featured both traditional and uncommon calligraphy styles. This year European, Slavonic, Arabic, Hebrew, Chinese, Japanese, Korean and Indian calligraphy was appended with Mongolian: for the first time members of the International Association of Mongolian Calligraphy took part in the exhibition, and their art aroused a keen interest from both professionals and enthusiasts.

Many handwritten books were exhibited too, such as the handwritten Constitution of the Russian Federation, which is one of the major gems in museum's collection, or original art books varying from handmade pages of the Russian ABC Book illustrated by Marina Khankova to breath-taking and amply illuminated sheets of the St. John's Bible by Donald Jackson.

A highlight on the guest list was Timothy Noad, the Scribe and Illuminator to Her Majesty's Crown Office and an outstanding heraldry and illumination artist. He is renowned for his crafted Royal Charters and coin designs.

Project’s development

National Union of Calligraphers 

On May 14, 2008 the National Union of Calligraphers was established at the International Exhibition of Calligraphy. The handwritten charter with many famous Russian calligraphers’ signatures testifies to the Union's birth. Under the Charter the Union aims at revival of the art of calligraphy in Russia, creating conditions for its development and admitting everybody who is willing to learn the beauty of writing. Petr Chobitko was elected Chairman of the Union with Alexey Shaburov as its President.

The most outstanding Union's masterpiece is the Handwritten Constitution of the Russian Federation performed by Pyotr Chobitko in person. It is stored at Contemporary Museum of Calligraphy. Miniature copies of the piece have been prepared as gift editions.

See also 

 Calligraphy
 Writing system

References

External links 
 
 Contemporary Museum of Calligraphy
 National Union of Calligraphers

Calligraphy organizations, societies, and schools